Sandhammaren is a Swedish lighthouse, and the name of both a beach and a point east of Ystad in Scania. At first two identical lighthouses were constructed, because it was a risk to mistake this lighthouse with the one on Ertholmene. The flame first ran on colza oil. Later on (1891), one of the lighthouses was put out of service and moved to Pite-Rönnskär in Norrland, at the same time the lamp was transformed to a paraffin lamp. The lighthouse was electrified in 1952.

The Swedish Maritime Administration owns and runs the lighthouse.

See also

 List of lighthouses and lightvessels in Sweden

References

External links

 Sjofartsverket  
 The Swedish Lighthouse Society

Lighthouses completed in 1862
Lighthouses in Sweden
1862 establishments in Sweden